Yahyaabad (also Romanized as Yaḩyáābād) is a village in Saadatabad Rural District, Pariz District, Sirjan County, Kerman Province, Iran. At the 2006 census, its population was 565, in 128 families.

References 

Populated places in Sirjan County